Allen Lowrie (10 October 1948 - 30 August 2021) was a Western Australian botanist. He was recognised for his expertise on the genera Drosera and Stylidium.

Lowrie, originally a businessman and inventor, first experienced the carnivorous flora of Western Australia in the late sixties and studied it as an amateur. Over time, his hobby turned into a profession and Lowrie discovered and described numerous species (especially Drosera, Byblis and Utricularia), partly together with Neville Marchant. From 1987 to 1998 he published Carnivorous Plants of Australia in three volumes; a fourth is in the making.

References 

1948 births
2021 deaths
20th-century Australian botanists
Scientists from Western Australia
21st-century Australian botanists